Chong Gang-song (born 15 October 1973) is a North Korean former footballer. He represented North Korea on at least eleven occasions between 1992 and 1998. He also represented the unified Korean team at the 1991 FIFA World Youth Championship.

Career statistics

International

References

1973 births
Living people
North Korean footballers
North Korea youth international footballers
North Korea international footballers
Association football defenders
Pyongyang Sports Club players